Leslie Ann Fu (born November 23, 1992), better known as fuslie, is an American live streamer, YouTuber, content creator, and musician. She is also a content creator for the gaming organization and lifestyle brand 100 Thieves.

Early life
Fu was born on November 23, 1992 to Chinese parents in the San Francisco Bay Area. She attended Homestead High School in Cupertino, California. Fu graduated from the University of California, Irvine in 2014, earning a bachelor's degree in biological sciences. Fu briefly attended graduate school at the University of California, Los Angeles for teaching before dropping out to pursue streaming full-time.

Career
Fu began streaming on Twitch in February 2015 after being introduced to the activity by her roommates. Before branching out towards a wider variety of games, she primarily streamed League of Legends. She briefly was a streamer for professional League of Legends teams Immortals and Phoenix1.

In December 2018, Fu, along with fellow Twitch streamer BoxBox, hosted a 4-day streaming boot camp titled "Streamer Camp", an event aimed at improving the skills of up-and-coming Twitch streamers and content creators. A second edition of the event was held in June 2019.

In April 2019, Fu was featured in an advertisement for karaoke video game Twitch Sings.

Fu was one of many streamers affected by the large wave of DMCA takedown notices issued against Twitch in June 2020. After receiving two strikes, Fu criticized the platform's response to the situation saying, "On top of it being near impossible for me to delete 100,000 clips, the creator dashboard isn't loading any of my old clips. How am I supposed to protect myself here? This is an issue way bigger than me. Content creators aren't being informed by Twitch on the proper steps to protect themselves from this happening, and there has to be a better way to handle this than suddenly striking our accounts and banning us out of nowhere"

In June 2020, Fu participated in a Chess.com tournament for Twitch streamers titled PogChamps. She made it to the quarterfinals of the consolation bracket, where she lost to fellow streamer xQc. Fu would later be one of over 40 streamers featured on the cover of the August 2020 edition of Chess Life.

On September 2, 2020, Fu announced that she signed an exclusive contract with Twitch.

On May 12, 2021, Fu announced that she joined lifestyle brand and gaming organization 100 Thieves as a content creator.

On August 12, 2021, Fu starred in the music video for Sub Urban and Bella Poarch's song, "Inferno". She also participated in a stream promoting the video. That same day, she hit 1 million followers on Twitch.

On September 6, 2022, Fu announced that she would be leaving Twitch for an exclusive streaming contract on YouTube.

Philanthropy
In March 2019, Fu partnered with the North America Scholastic Esports Federation (NASEF) and the Anaheim Ducks hockey team in holding an NHL 19 tournament. The tournament gave away over $25,000 in scholarships and grants to high school students. Fu has also spoken to NASEF voicing her support for women in gaming.

On December 2, 2019, Fu held a charity fundraiser stream benefitting Stand Up to Cancer. Fu and her viewers raised over $30,000 for cancer research.

On October 19, 2021, Fu in collaboration with 100 Thieves hosted a charity fundraiser streamer for the National Breast Cancer Foundation, raising $55,000.

Personal life
Fu dated former OfflineTV manager Edison Park, and the couple became engaged on April 7, 2019 before announcing their split in September 2021.

Discography

Singles

As a featured artist

Filmography

Game show

Music videos

Awards and nominations

Notes

References

External links

 
 

Twitch (service) streamers
University of California, Irvine alumni
American people of Chinese descent
1992 births
Living people
People from the San Francisco Bay Area
People from Los Altos, California
People from Los Angeles
Let's Players
YouTube streamers
YouTube channels launched in 2015